Felizarda da Conceição Jorge (born February 23, 1985) is an Angolan basketball player. At the 2012 Summer Olympics, she competed for the Angola women's national basketball team in the women's event. She is 5 ft 8 inches tall.

References

External links
 

Angolan women's basketball players
1985 births
Living people
Olympic basketball players of Angola
Basketball players at the 2012 Summer Olympics
Basketball players from Luanda
Power forwards (basketball)
C.D. Maculusso basketball players
C.D. Primeiro de Agosto women's basketball players
G.D. Interclube women's basketball players
African Games silver medalists for Angola
African Games medalists in basketball
Competitors at the 2011 All-Africa Games